Louis Theroux's Weird Weekends is a television documentary series, in which Louis Theroux gives viewers the chance to get brief glimpses into the worlds of individuals and groups that they would not normally come into contact with or experience up close. In most cases this means interviewing people with extreme beliefs of some kind, or just generally belonging to subcultures not known to exist by most or just frowned upon. It was first shown in the United Kingdom on BBC2. In 2001, Theroux was awarded the Richard Dimbleby Award as well as the Best Presenter BAFTA for his work on the series.

Louis Theroux's view on Weird Weekends:

Episodes

Series overview

Series 1 (1998)

Series 2 (1999)

Series 3 (2000)

Book
In 2005 Louis released a book called The Call of the Weird: Travels in American Subcultures where he revisits people he previously interviewed for the Weird Weekends documentaries. He attempts to track down ten of his subjects, up to seven years after the shows, claiming a desire to see what "changes in their subcultures might say about the changes in the world at large", or at least "curious of what became of some of the odd folk [he] got to know".

He tracks down Thor Templar (alien resistance commander), JJ Michaels (porn star), Ike Turner (musician and ex-husband of Tina, from an uncompleted episode), Mike Cain (survivalist), Haley (prostitute), Jerry Gruidl (Aryan Nations), Mello T (pimp turned rapper), Oscody (survivor of Heaven's Gate, also from an incomplete episode), Marshall Sylver (Hypnotist), and Lamb & Lynx (the singing White Nationalist twins – aged 11).

See also
 List of Louis Theroux documentaries
 Louis Theroux's BBC Two specials
 When Louis Met...

References

External links

Louis Theroux's Weird Weekends from TV.com
Louis Theroux's Weird Weekends Episode Guide from BFI.org

1998 British television series debuts
2000 British television series endings
BBC television documentaries
English-language television shows
Weird Weekends